William Mitchell was a former Australian professional soccer player who last played as a right winger for Latrobe and the Australia national soccer team.

Club career
Mitchell began his senior club career by joining Queens Park in 1920. He transferred to Brisbane City in the 1922 season. In 1924, he joined his final club Latrobe until 1929, where he played for a year with Pineapple Rovers. He returned to Latrobe in 1930, winning three Queensland state Premierships in 1930, 1931 and 1932.

International career
Mitchell began his international career as a right winger with Australia in an international friendly, debuting in a 2–1 win over New Zealand as their first win in an international match.

Career statistics

International

References

Australian soccer players
Association football forwards
Australia international soccer players